Eugene Earl Host (January 1, 1933 – August 20, 1998) was an American Major League Baseball pitcher and minor league all-star.

Career
Host was signed by the Detroit Tigers as an amateur free agent just before the 1952 season. Host went 26-7 with a 1.81 ERA. He was named to the Coastal Plain League all-star team.

He made it to the major league club for one game in 1956. Following the 1956 season, Host was traded by the Detroit Tigers with Wayne Belardi, Ned Garver, Virgil Trucks, and $20,000 to the Kansas City Athletics for Jim Finigan, Jack Crimian, Bill Harrington, and Eddie Robinson.

Host made eleven appearances for Kansas City in 1957. He ended his big league career with a 0–2 record and a 7.31 ERA. He continued on in the minor leagues through the 1961 campaign.

External links

1933 births
1998 deaths
Detroit Tigers players
Kansas City Athletics players
Kinston Eagles players
Montgomery Grays players
Durham Bulls players
Wilkes-Barre Barons (baseball) players
Little Rock Travelers players
Charleston Senators players
Buffalo Bisons (minor league) players
Denver Bears players
San Antonio Missions players
Indianapolis Indians players
Nashville Vols players
Major League Baseball pitchers
Baseball players from Pennsylvania
People from Clarion County, Pennsylvania